Baddua is Pakistani television series that aired on ARY Digital from 20 September 2021 - 18 April 2022. It is produced by Abdullah Seja under banner iDream Entertainment. It features Amar Khan and Muneeb Butt as leads. Baddua revolves around Abeer, a modern girl who is antagonized because she does not want to follow the conservative rules laid out by her household.

Cast 
Amar Khan as Abeer
Muneeb Butt as Junaid
Mohsin Abbas Haider as Mohsin
Maryam Noor as Neelum
Mehmood Aslam as Mudassir
Shaheen Khan as Kausar 
Hareem Sohail as Falak
Saba Faisal as Ather and Junaid's mother
Osama Tahir as Affan 
Salma Hassan as Ayesha
Samina Ahmed as Mudassir's mother
Fareeda Shabbir as Haleema
Rubina Ashraf 
Birjees Farooqui as Afshan
Komal Rizvi as Ather's wife
Abdullah Ejaz as Ather 
Mariam Ansari as Annie
Shazia Gohar as Shabana
Ayesha Rajpoot
Ushna Saqib
Mohsin Gillani
Hammad Farooqui

References 

ARY Digital original programming
2021 Pakistani television series debuts
Pakistani drama television series